Under Your Skin may refer to:

 Under Your Skin (album), a 2011 album by Saliva
 "Under Your Skin" (song), a 2017 song by Seeb and Rock City
 Under Your Skin (film), a 1966 Finnish film
 "Under Your Skin", a song by Luscious Jackson from the 1996 album Fever In Fever Out